Esteban Manuel Antonio Castillo Cabrera (born April 1, 1957) is a former Major League Baseball third baseman. He batted and threw right-handed, and was 5 foot 9. He played in 236 games in his career, with a batting average of .242 with 174 hits in 719 at-bats. He had 3 stolen bases, 3 home runs, 73 RBI and 63 runs.

Castillo had his best season in 1982 with the Mariners when he had 130 hits, had an average of .257, and all 3 of his career home runs.

As of 2018, Castillo is a coach in the Tampa Bay Rays farm system.

External links

1957 births
Living people
Arkansas Travelers players
American Association (1902–1997) MVP Award winners
Cafeteros de Córdoba players
Diablos Rojos del México players
Dominican Republic expatriate baseball players in Mexico
Dominican Republic expatriate baseball players in the United States
Fort Myers Sun Sox players
Ganaderos de Tabasco players
Kansas City Royals players

Major League Baseball players from the Dominican Republic
Major League Baseball third basemen
Marion Mets players
Minor league baseball managers
New Orleans Pelicans (baseball) players
Omaha Royals players
Saraperos de Saltillo players
Seattle Mariners players
Sportspeople from Santo Domingo
Springfield Redbirds players
Syracuse Chiefs players
Wausau Mets players